Jay Gooding (born 13 May 1976) is an Australian tennis coach and former professional player.

Gooding was born in Melbourne and raised on Queensland's Sunshine Coast. He attended Nambour State High School.

Turning professional in 1998, Gooding competed mostly in ITF satellite and Futures tournaments, with the occasional ATP Challenger appearance. He won five ITF Futures titles in doubles.

Gooding, who had a best singles world ranking of 488, made an ATP Tour main draw at the Franklin Templeton Classic in Scottsdale, where after coming through qualifying he lost in the first round to James Blake.

Based in the United States, Gooding now works as a coach and runs the Gooding Todero Academy, which he founded with Argentine Jorge Todero. Gooding previously had an academy in New York and as a USTA coach was involved in coaching Christina McHale and Melanie Oudin. As a personal coach he has toured with Louisa Chirico, helping her reach a career high ranking of 58. In 2020 he became head coach of the Orlando Storm in World TeamTennis.

ITF Futures titles

Doubles: (5)

References

External links
 
 

1976 births
Living people
Australian male tennis players
Australian tennis coaches
Sportspeople from the Sunshine Coast
Tennis people from Queensland